Brown Bag LP was the debut album by Citizen King released on Don't Records.

Notes
They supported this recording with shows in and around their home city of Milwaukee, Wisconsin.  The album has several tracks produced by Speech of Arrested Development fame.  The songs are a hybrid brew of funk, punk, hip hop, R&B, jazz, blues, and soul.  Local favorites performed during this era at their energetic, kinetic live shows at venues such as Milwaukee's The Rave included "Masquerade," "Beautiful Machine," "Amerekan" and "100 P.S.I."  Citizen King's later recordings are a significant departure from the raw style presented on Brown Bag LP.

Track listing
100 PSI
Passenger
Feathered Friends
Amerekan
Beautiful Machine
Good and Gone
Intermission
Masquerade
Low in the Shadow
Pitiful Men
Who's That?
Test Tube Blues

Personnel
Matt Sims - lead vocals
Kristian Riley - guitar
Dave Cooley - keyboards
Malcolm Michiles - turntables
DJ Brooks - drums
John Dominguez - bass

Credits
Performed by Citizen King.
Produced by Citizen King and Speech.
Mastered by Rick Bauer.
Design by Scott Schwebel.
Track list from Allmusic.

References

1995 debut albums